Tacariju Thomé de Paula (January 30, 1917 – September 1, 2005) was a Brazilian Olympic sailor in the Star class. He competed in the 1952 Summer Olympics together with Cid Nascimento, where they finished 12th.

References

Olympic sailors of Brazil
Brazilian male sailors (sport)
Star class sailors
Sailors at the 1952 Summer Olympics – Star
1917 births
2005 deaths